The second Gotabaya Rajapaksa cabinet was the central government of Sri Lanka led by President Gotabaya Rajapaksa. It was formed in August 2020 after the parliamentary election and ended in April 2022 after all 26 cabinet ministers resigned en masse amidst the 2022 Sri Lankan protests.

Cabinet members
Ministers appointed under article 43(1) of the constitution.

State ministers
Ministers appointed under article 44(1) of the constitution.

Notes

References

2020 establishments in Sri Lanka
2022 disestablishments in Sri Lanka
Cabinets established in 2020
Cabinets disestablished in 2022
Cabinet of Sri Lanka
Gotabaya Rajapaksa